SMS S115  was a  of the Imperial German Navy that served during the First World War. The ship was built by Schichau at Elbing in Prussia (now Elbląg in Poland), and was completed in February 1903. The ship was sunk during the Battle off Texel on 17 October 1914.

Construction and design
The S90-class consisted of 48 torpedo-boats, built between 1898 and 1907 by Schichau and Germaniawerft for the Imperial German Navy. They were larger than previous German torpedo-boats, allowing them to work effectively with the High Seas Fleet in the North Sea, while also being large enough to act as flotilla leader when necessary, thus eliminating the need for separate larger division boats.

S115 was one of a group of six torpedo boats built by Schichau between 1902 and 1903. She was launched from Schichau's Elbing shipyard on 10 September 1902 and commissioned on 22 February 1903.

While the S90-class were of similar size to contemporary foreign torpedo-boat destroyers, the German navy saw their role as primarily torpedo attack against opposing fleets, rather than defending their own fleet against attack, so the ships had a lighter gun armament than British destroyers, and a lower silhouette to avoid detection during night attacks. S115 had a gun armament of three 5 cm SK L/40 guns in single mounts, while torpedo armament consisted of three single 450 mm torpedo tubes (one in a well deck between the raised forecastle and the bridge, with the remaining two tubes aft of the bridge. Two reload torpedoes were carried. The ship had a complement of 49 officers and men.

Service
In May 1904 S115 was part of the 6th Torpedo-boat Division of the 1st Torpedo-boat Flotilla, while in 1907, she was listed as part of the 8th Half-flotilla of the 2nd School Flotilla, remaining part of the 8th Half-Flotilla in 1908. In 1910, she was listed as part of the 9th Half-Flotilla of the 5th Torpedoboat Flotilla, remaining there until 1912. In 1913 S115 was fitted with new boilers. In 1914, S115 formed part of the 7th Half-Flotilla of the 4th Torpedo-boat Flotilla.

S115 remained part of the 7th Half-Flotilla on the outbreak of the First World War in August 1914. In October 1914, in an attempt to take advantage of the Royal Navy's distraction by operations in the English Channel, the German Navy decided to lay a minefield off the mouth of the River Thames or in The Downs. Four torpedo-boats of the 7th Half-Flotilla ( (leader), S115,  and ) set out from the Ems on 17 October 1914, with these elderly ships selected for this mission because they were unfit for other duties and considered disposable. Later that day, the four torpedo boats ran into a British patrol on the Broad Fourteens off Terschelling in the Netherlands. S115 was heavily damaged by Lance and Lennox, with survivors abandoning ship, before being finished off by Undaunted. The British rescued 34 officers and men from the four German ships, with two more picked up the next day by a neutral fishing vessel. 55 of S115s crew were lost.

References

Bibliography

 
 

 

Torpedo boats of the Imperial German Navy
World War I torpedo boats of Germany
1902 ships
Ships built in Elbing
Ships built by Schichau
Maritime incidents in October 1914
World War I shipwrecks in the North Sea